Youhaiella tibetensis is a gram-negative bacteria from the family of Youhaiella which has been isolated from the Qiangtang Basin permafrost in China.

References

Hyphomicrobiales
Bacteria described in 2015